Gilson Tussi Júnior (born 6 July 1984) is a Brazilian footballer who plays for Ríver.

He was signed by AC Lugano in July 2007. He also holds Italian passport.

Gilson Tussi trained with Chivas USA during the 2010 preseason, but wasn't signed by the club. In December 2010 he returned to Brazil for Morrinhos. In June, he was signed by Anapolina and in August signed by Penarol Atlético Clube of Brasileiro Série D.

Gilson Tussi played for Syrian side Al-Shorta SC Damascus.

References

External links
Brazilian FA Database 

1984 births
Living people
Brazilian footballers
Brazilian expatriate footballers
Tupi Football Club players
Brazilian people of Italian descent
Association football midfielders
Sportspeople from Paraná (state)
Expatriate footballers in Syria
Santos Futebol Clube (AP) players
Syrian Premier League players